Duane Slick (born 1961) is a Meskwaki artist and educator of Ho-Chunk descent. He is known for his monochromatic paintings. He has taught fine arts at Rhode Island School of Design (RISD) since 1995.

Biography 
Duane Slick was born 1961 in Waterloo, Iowa, to a Meskwaki father and a Ho-Chunk mother. He received a BFA degree in painting and a BA degree in Art Education from the University of Northern Iowa. Slick completed an MFA degree in 1990 in painting from the University of California, Davis (UC Davis). While at UC Davis, he was mentored by artist, George Longfish.

He previously taught at Institute of American Indian Arts (IAIA) in Santa Fe, New Mexico, from 1992 and 1995. Since 1995, Slick teaches fine arts at Rhode Island School of Design (RISD).

In 2010, he was a resident at School for Advanced Research (SAR), where he created his work Field Mouse Goes to War. In 2012, Slick was awarded the Eiteljorg Contemporary Art Fellowship, and his work was included in the associated group exhibition, We Are Here! (2012).

Slick's work is included in many public art collections including the National Museum of American History at the Smithsonian Institution, Danforth Art Museum, Des Moines Art Center, among others.

References

External links 
Duane Slick faculty page at Rhode Island School of Design
Duane Slick on Artnet.com

1961 births
Artists from Providence, Rhode Island
Institute of American Indian Arts faculty
Living people
Native American painters
Native American printmakers
People from Waterloo, Iowa
Rhode Island School of Design faculty
Sac and Fox people
University of California, Davis alumni
University of Northern Iowa alumni
20th-century Native Americans
21st-century Native Americans